Tapinauchenius is a genus of tarantulas that was first described by Anton Ausserer in 1871. In 2022, the genus Pseudoclamoris was transferred to Tapinauchenius.

Description
They have true iridescent colors that change based on the amount of light and viewing angle. They lack urticating hairs and are arboreal, often found in tree cavities. Many species have "dimples" on the abdomen, but this feature is not universal. Although their behavior is defensive, they lack both urticating hairs and the ability to stridulate, giving them a very mild venom. Their egg sacs can contain up to 200 spiderlings.

Diagnosis 
They differ from all of the other Psalmopoeinae genera by the lack of stridulatory organs in the palpal coxa, and from Ephebopus by the lack of urticating hairs on palpal femora. The species of this genus also lacks ontogenetic pattern change, in other words, juveniles are uniformly colored, as compared to other genus, in which juveniles have a different pattern than adults.

Pet ownership
This genus is well known by hobbyists for their incredible speed and striking coloration, but is not recommended for inexperienced owners. They are extremely skittish and defensive, and combined with their speed, handling them is not recommended. The height of their enclosure is more important than floor space, preferring  of height and at least  of floor space. They prefer organic potting soil with the wood removed, though similar substrates can be substituted. Their diet consists of crickets, roaches, worms, or generic tarantula food, and most need a shallow dish of water or occasional misting. With proper care, these spiders can live for up to eighteen years.

Species
The genus Tapinauchenius was erected by Anton Ausserer in 1871 for the species Tapinauchenius plumipes, first described by Carl Ludwig Koch in 1842 in the genus Mygale and then moved by him to the genus Eurypelma.  it contains nine species, found only in South America and the Caribbean:
Tapinauchenius brunneus Schmidt, 1995 – Brazil
Tapinauchenius cupreus Schmidt & Bauer, 1996 – Ecuador
Tapinauchenius gretae Cifuentes & Bertani, 2022 – Brazil
Tapinauchenius herrerai Gabriel & Sherwood, 2022 - Panama
Tapinauchenius latipes L. Koch, 1875 – Venezuela, Trinidad and Tobago, Guyana
Tapinauchenius plumipes (C. L. Koch, 1842) (type) – Guyana, Suriname, French Guiana, Brazil
Tapinauchenius polybotes Hüsser, 2018 – Lesser Antilles (St. Lucia)
Tapinauchenius rasti Hüsser, 2018 – Lesser Antilles (St. Vincent and the Grenadines)
Tapinauchenius sanctivincenti (Walckenaer, 1837) – St. Vincent

In synonymy 
 Tapinauchenius concolor (Caporiacco, 1947) = Tapinauchenius plumipes
 Tapinauchenius deborri (Becker, 1879) = Tapinauchenius plumipes
 Tapinauchenius gigas (Caporiacco, 1954) = Tapinauchenius plumipes
 Tapinauchenius purpureus Schmidt, 1995 = Tapinauchenius plumipes
 Tapinauchenius violaceus (Mello-Leitão, 1930) = Tapinauchenius plumipes

Nomen dubium 
 Tapinauchenius caerulescens Simon, 1891 - United States
 Tapinauchenius subcaeruleus Bauer & Antonelli, 1997 - Ecuador
 Tapinauchenius texensis Simon, 1891 - United States

Transferred to other genera 
 Tapinauchenius elenae Schmidt, 1994 → Amazonius elenae
 Tapinauchenius grossus (Ausserer, 1871) →  Grammostola grossa

See also
 List of Theraphosidae species

References

Theraphosidae genera
Spiders of South America
Taxa named by Anton Ausserer
Theraphosidae